Michael Kmech (November 21, 1934 – February 23, 2022) was a Canadian football player who played for the Edmonton Eskimos. He won the Grey Cup with the Eskimos in 1956. He was born in Lamont, Alberta. Kmech died in Edmonton, Alberta on February 23, 2022, at the age of 87.

References

1934 births
2022 deaths
Edmonton Elks players
People from Lamont, Alberta
Players of Canadian football from Alberta